The Dunn Engineering Special was a racecar entered in the Indianapolis 500 during the second half of the 1950s, when the race was part of the FIA World Championship.

The cars were powered by the then-ubiquitous Offenhauser engine and were driven by Pat Flaherty, Al Keller, Chuck Weyant and Al Herman. Their best result was tenth in 1955.

Formula One constructors (Indianapolis only)
American racecar constructors
Companies based in Indianapolis